Stolen Assignment is a 1955 British comedy film directed by Terence Fisher and starring John Bentley and Hy Hazell. The film was produced by Francis Searle for Act Films Ltd, and was a sequel to Fisher's Final Appointment of the previous year, featuring sleuthing journalists Mike Billings and Jenny Drew.

Premise
When an artist's wife is murdered, rival reporters compete to solve the crime and win a scoop.

Cast

John Bentley as Mike Billings
Hy Hazell as Jenny Drew
Eddie Byrne as Inspector Corcoran
Patrick Holt as Henry Crossley
Joyce Carey as Ida Garnett
Kay Callard as Stella Watson
Violet Gould as Mrs. Hudson
Jessica Cairns as Marilyn Dawn
Charles Farrell as Percy Simpson
Michael Ellison as Danny Hudson
Desmond Rayner as John Smith	
Graham Stuart as Coroner	
Frank Forsyth as Dr Roberts	
Clement Hamelin as Seth Makepeace	
John Watson as Plain Clothes Detective Sgt.	
Raymond Rollett as Desk Sergeant

References

External links

1955 films
British comedy films
1955 comedy films
Films directed by Terence Fisher
1950s English-language films
1950s British films
British black-and-white films